Mohanbhog is a village located in the Indian state of Tripura in Sipahijala district. As of 2011 census, Mohanbhog had a population of 4,829. 2,457 people are male. 2,372 are female.

See also 
 List of cities and towns in Tripura

References 

Villages in Sipahijala district